Frysztat County was an administrative territorial entity of the Second Polish Republic. Named after its capital in the town of Frysztat (now Fryštát district of the town Karviná, Czech Republic), it was part of Silesian Voivodeship, and existed from October 1938 until German Invasion of Poland in September 1939. The county had four towns: Frysztat, Bogumin Nowy, Karwina and Orłowa.

In early October 1938, the government in Warsaw sent an ultimatum to Prague, demanding the return of the region of Zaolzie, which the Czechs had annexed in 1919-20. Czechoslovak government agreed, and units of the Polish Army entered the region, annexing an area of 801.5 km2 with a population of 227,399 people. Polish government divided Zaolzie into two counties - Frysztat and West Cieszyn. On October 27, 1938, Frysztat County officially became part of Silesian Voivodeship, on the same day, West Cieszyn County was merged with Cieszyn County.

On January 31, 1939, Frysztat County was expanded by the gminas of Gruszów, Hermanice, Michałkowice, Radwanice and Ostrawa Śląska. Also, some smaller territorial changes were introduced.

The process of legal integration of Zaolzie into Poland was never completed, as on September 1, 1939 German invaded Poland, and after the war, the region returned to Czechoslovakia.

Municipalities of the Frysztat County in 1938 - 39 
 Bogumin
 Bogumin Nowy
 Darków
 Dąbrowa
 Dziećmorowice
 Frysztat
 Karwina
 Lutynia Niemiecka
 Lutynia Polska
 Łazy
 Łąki
 Marklowice Dolne
 Olbrachcice
 Orłowa
 Piersna
 Pietwałd
 Piotrowice
 Poręba
 Pudłów
 Raj
 Rychwałd
 Skrzeczoń
 Stare Miasto
 Stonawa
 Sucha Dolna
 Sucha Górna
 Sucha Średnia
 Wierzbica
 Wierzniowice
 Zabłocie
 Zawada

References 

Silesian Voivodeship (1920–1939)
Cieszyn Silesia